The Silicon Valley International is an open international badminton open tournament held in California, United States. The event is part of the Badminton World Federation's International Series and part of the Badminton Pan America Circuit.

Previous winners

Performances by nation

References

Badminton tournaments in the United States